Ushakovka is a rural locality (a selo) in Chernoyarsky District, Astrakhan Oblast, Russia. The population was 1,565 as of 2010. There are 19 streets.

Geography 
Ushakovka is located 93 km northwest of Chyorny Yar (the district's administrative centre) by road. Solodniki is the nearest rural locality.

References 

Rural localities in Chernoyarsky District